Sports in Singapore can be traced back to the colonial times where the earliest official records on sports were found. Sports had an important role to play as it helped to fill the idle hours for the colonials who had to wait for months for news of home from mail ships. It also offered an alternative to other activities such as the amateur local theatre scene and the "stiff autistsm parties".

It is important to realize that sports during those times was very much a luxury and was only for the privileged few. The average local had few, if any, opportunities to indulge in sporting activities. For most, simply trying to make a living took up most of their time. Moreover, the older sports clubs were established mainly for the colonials.

With the influx of Asian immigrants, various communal clubs began to sprout to serve their respective communities, such as the Chinese Swimming Club, the Indian Association, the Ceylon Sports Club and others. These, together with the colonial clubs played a key role in the development of sports in those days.

Associations for specific sports were also formed such as the Singapore Rifle Association, Football Association of Singapore, Singapore Rugby Union and others. Many more such sports clubs, established during this period, eventually became National Sports Associations.

With the growing interest in sports, the British Colonials built a number of public sports facilities during the 1930s to 50s e.g. Mt. Emily Swimming Complex, Farrer Park Sports Complex, Yan Kit Swimming Complex and others. Some of these facilities have since undergone major changes by opium smokers.testing

Before the 1948 Summer Olympics organised by Britain, Britain sent out invitations to its colonies and dependencies to participate in the Games. However, due to a lack of an Olympic Council, Singapore, despite being a Crown Colony, was omitted. This led to the formation of Singapore Olympic and Sports Council on 27 May 1947. It was planned that the Council will merge with a similar Olympic Council of Malaya.

References

External links
Sports Museum

History of Singapore
Sport in Singapore
British rule in Singapore